The West Norwegian Fjords is the common name of two fjords in Norway listed as a World Heritage Site by UNESCO: the Geirangerfjord and the Nærøyfjord.

Geography

Location 
The World Heritage Site consists of two areas 120 km apart, located in south-west Norway, north-west of the city of Bergen, and part of the fjord landscape of western Norway extending over 500 km between Stavanger in the south and Åndalsnes in the north.  The areas of Geirangerfjord and Nærøyfjordtotal 122 712 hectares (111 966 ha terrestrial and 10 746 ha marine).

The Geirangerfjord area is situated 60 km inland and constitutes the Geirangerfjord itself as the upper end of Storfjorden as well as Tafjorden. The heritage cite lies in the county of Møre og Romsdal, extending into the municipalities of Fjord and Stranda. It covers 51 802 ha, of which 46 151 ha are terrestrial and 5 651 ha are marine.

The Nærøyfjord is situated 100 km inland and is the upper extremity of Sognefjord. It extends into the counties of Sogn og Fjordane (to the municipalities of Aurland, Vik and Lærdal) and Hordaland (into the municipality of Voss). In total it covers 70 910 ha : 65 815 ha on land and 5 095 ha are marine. It is crossed by European route E16.

Climate 
The two areas, though relatively distant, have a very similar climate, which is a transition between oceanic  and continental climates,. The region is favourable to microclimates. Snow persists from October to the end of May in the mountains and the end of November to March in the valleys. In winter, the sources of the fjords are frozen for a period of one to three weeks.

Human Presence

Human geography 
The area of Geirangerfjord had 230 inhabitants as of 2003, while Nærøyfjord had 243 inhabitants as of 2001.

Notes and References 

 World Heritage Centre

 Other references

Annexes

Bibliography 
 .
 .

Related articles 

 List of Norwegian fjords
 Geirangerfjord
 Nærøyfjord
 Description on the World Heritage Site

World Heritage Sites in Norway